The 2008–09 Georgia Tech Yellow Jackets men's basketball team played basketball for the Georgia Tech Yellow Jackets. In 2007-08, they went 11-10 (4-4 ACC). Georgia Institute of Technology's basketball program is one of the most popular and successful college basketball programs in the nation. The Yellow Jackets have been to 2 NCAA Final Fours and have won 3 ACC Championships in the past 25 years. The program is most well known for its famous alumni, such as Chris Bosh, Stephon Marbury, Kenny Anderson, John Salley, Mark Price, and Jarrett Jack. Bobby Cremins built the Georgia Tech basketball program from the basement up and passed the torch to current head coach Paul Hewitt. Hewitt's teams feed off pressure defense and fast-paced transition offenses.

Roster 
Information from 2008-09 roster, subject to change.

Schedule

References 

Georgia Tech Yellow Jackets men's basketball seasons
Georgia Tech
Georgia Tech Yellow Jackets
Georgia Tech Yellow Jackets